GameStar is a monthly-released PC gaming magazine in Germany. It is the best-selling German-language magazine focused on PC gaming and it also hosts the largest video gaming-related portal in the German-speaking internet.

Content 

The print magazine features the following content:

News about the PC gaming community
Previews of PC games, (games which still are in development)
Reviews of lately released or to be released PC games
A section about freeware and open source games, mods and e-sports.
Articles about recent PC hardware components with regard to computer gaming (e.g. joysticks or computer mice)
Articles about important events, that influence the gaming community at large (i.e.: E-Sports, Censorship, etc.)

The magazine also comes with a DVD, which features Demos, Mods, video-reviews as well as a full retail version of a videogame.

Versions 
GameStar has been in published in various versions with different features. This includes the magazine version (which does not include any DVDs and is thus cheaper), a "normal" edition, which includes one DVD, and a XL Version, which contains 2 DVDs. The magazine for subscribers has less advertisement and shows a larger front-page picture. Until mid-2005 a CD-only version was also available, but it was decided that DVD-readers in Computers had become widespread enough, and so the CD-version was deemed unnecessary. Instead the XL version appeared for the first time.

History and editorship 
GameStar was founded by Charles Glimm, Jörg Langer und Toni Schwaiger with the IDG Entertainment Media GmbH as publisher and debuted in September 1997, with Jörg Langer as editor-in-chief.

The new magazine soon gained a lot of popularity. By the fourth quarter of 1999 it sold about 333,000 issues per month, in 2000 it overtook competitor PC Games as the largest German language videogames magazine in Europe.

IDG also started GameStar sister magazines in Italy, Poland, Hungary, the Czech Republic and the United States. The US version was, quite differently from the rest, positioned as a magazine for adults, about PC and console games, similar to inCite. However they all folded after a few months due to disappointing sales. The only long term launch was achieved in Hungary. In 2005, GameStar spawned a sister magazine called /GameStar/dev which is targeted at European Game Developers. GameStar also has a sister magazine named GamePro, which focuses on console games. Incidentally its headquarters are right next-door to the GameStar office.

In April 2015 GameStar and its sister magazine GamePro were sold by IDG to the French publisher Webedia.

Jörg Langer was succeeded by Gunnar Lott as editor-in-chief, followed by Michael Trier on 1 December 2007. As of June 2016, editor-in-Chief is Heiko Klinge.

GameStar also held a popular known E-Sports-League, the GameStar Clanliga, featuring games such a Warcraft III, Counter-Strike as well as Tactial Ops.

Sales and popularity 
After it launched, GameStar was able to steadily gain in popularity. By the fourth quarter of 1999, it had sold about 331.535 issues per month and in 2000 it overtook its competitor PC Games as the largest German-language PC game magazine in Europe. Since then, GameStar has kept the spot as the best-selling German-language PC gaming-focused magazine in Europe.

Like the whole print market, GameStar was affected by diminishing sales. In 2008, the average monthly circulation was 250,000 copies, but by January 2015 sold issues per month had dropped to 63,189. Despite the drop, GameStar remains the highest-selling German -language PC gaming-focused magazine in Europe.

gamestar.de and GSPB 

GameStar hosts a large PC gaming-related portal in the internet. Like the magazine, the portal is centered on PC gaming and publishes news, reviews and tests for PC games and PC gaming related topics. GameStar.de is the largest PC gaming web portal in the German-speaking internet and one of the largest web portals in the entirety of the German-speaking internet.

On YouTube, GameStar has its own channel with over 1.24 million subscribers and over 946 million views (as of July 2020). During its history, GameStar and IDG also hosted several spin-off YouTube channels, such as High5, with temporary success. As off September 2015, those have been already closed.

GameStar also hosts a large internet forum, the GSPB (GameStar Pinboard). It is one of largest internet forums in the German-speaking internet.

References

External links 
 

1997 establishments in Germany
German-language magazines
Video game magazines published in Germany
International Data Group
Magazines established in 1997